Sehwi, also known as Sefwi, Esahie, and Asahyue, is a Niger-Congo language spoken by 305,000 across southwestern Ghana, principally in the Western Region. It is a Kwa language of the Central Tano branch, closely related to Anyin, and mutually intelligible with the Sannvin dialect of Anyin; its two main dialects are Wiawso, spoken in the southern area of the Sehwi territory, and Anhwiaso, spoken in the northern area. It is the common language of the Sehwi people.

Virtually all speakers of Sehwi are bilingual in Twi, which is used as the trade language in the region. However, the Sehwi people are fond of their language, such that other tribes who come to stay with Sehwi people tend to speak Sehwi.

References

Central Tano languages
Languages of Ghana
Sefwi people